
The Committee on Earth Observation Satellites (CEOS) is an international organization created in 1984 around the topic of Earth observation satellites.

As of 2023, it has 34 national space agencies as regular members and other 29 associate members.

See also
Global Change Master Directory
Group on Earth Observations
List of Earth observation satellites

References

Further reading

External links
 

International scientific organizations
Space organizations
Remote sensing organizations